Information geometry is an interdisciplinary field that applies the techniques of differential geometry to study probability theory and statistics.   It studies statistical manifolds, which are Riemannian manifolds whose points correspond to probability distributions.

Introduction 

Historically, information geometry can be traced back to the work of C. R. Rao, who was the first to treat the Fisher matrix as a Riemannian metric. The modern theory is largely due to Shun'ichi Amari, whose work has been greatly influential on the development of the field.

Classically, information geometry considered a parametrized statistical model as a Riemannian manifold. For such models, there is a natural choice of Riemannian metric, known as the Fisher information metric. In the special case that the statistical model is an exponential family, it is possible to induce the statistical manifold with a Hessian metric (i.e a Riemannian metric given by the potential of a convex function). In this case, the manifold naturally inherits two flat affine connections, as well as a canonical Bregman divergence. Historically, much of the work was devoted to studying the associated geometry of these examples. In the modern setting, information geometry applies to a much wider context, including non-exponential families, nonparametric statistics, and even abstract statistical manifolds not induced from a known statistical model. The results combine techniques from information theory, affine differential geometry, convex analysis and many other fields.

The standard references in the field are Shun’ichi Amari and Hiroshi Nagaoka's book, Methods of Information Geometry, and the more recent book by Nihat Ay and others. A gentle introduction is given in the survey by Frank Nielsen. In 2018, the journal Information Geometry was released, which is devoted to the field.

Contributors 

The history of information geometry is associated with the discoveries of at least the following people, and many others.

 Ronald Fisher
 Harald Cramér
 Calyampudi Radhakrishna Rao
 Harold Jeffreys 
 Solomon Kullback
 Jean-Louis Koszul
 Richard Leibler
 Claude Shannon
 Imre Csiszár
 N. N. Cencov (also written as Chentsov)
 Bradley Efron
 Shun'ichi Amari
 Ole Barndorff-Nielsen
 Frank Nielsen 
 Damiano Brigo
 A. W. F. Edwards
 Grant Hillier
 Kees Jan Van Garderen

Applications 

As an interdisciplinary field, information geometry has been used in various applications.

Here an incomplete list:
 Statistical inference 
 Time series and linear systems
 Quantum systems
 Neural networks
 Machine learning
 Statistical mechanics
 Biology
 Statistics  
 Mathematical finance

See also
 Ruppeiner geometry
 Kullback–Leibler divergence
 Stochastic geometry

References

External links 
  Information Geometry journal by Springer
 Information Geometry overview by Cosma Rohilla Shalizi, July 2010
 Information Geometry notes by John Baez, November 2012
 Information geometry for neural networks(pdf ), by Daniel Wagenaar